The Pillowcase is a collaboration EP between alternative rock artist Matthew Sweet and Bangles singer Susanna Hoffs. Released by Shout! Factory in 2006 in collaboration with Parasol Records as a double-7" vinyl, it contains 4 cover versions of favorite songs from the 1960s.  It was designed as a companion piece to Sweet and Hoffs' album, Under the Covers, Vol. 1.  Two of the tracks on the EP appear on that album, while the other two tracks were originally exclusive to the EP, but were later released in the compilation box set Completely Under the Covers.

Track listing

* tracks initially exclusive to this EP

Personnel
Matthew Sweet - vocals, guitar, organ, piano
Susanna Hoffs - vocals
Ivan Julian - acoustic guitar, "feedback"
Richard Lloyd - guitar
Van Dyke Parks - piano
Ric Menck - drums, tambourine
Julie Pusch - violin, viola
Joseph Harvey - cello
Shawn Amos - executive producer
Bob Ludwig - mastering
Henry Diltz - photography
Ed Fotheringham - illustrations
Jeff Palo - artwork, package supervision
Todd Gallopo - package design
Julee Stover - editorial supervision
Emily Johnson - project assistant
John Roberts - project assistant

References

External links
 Official Myspace site
 Parasol Records website

2006 EPs
Matthew Sweet albums
Susanna Hoffs albums
Collaborative albums
Shout! Factory albums
Albums produced by Matthew Sweet